Chairman's Handicap may refer to:
 Chairman's Handicap (ATC)
 Chairman's Handicap (BRC)